Juraj Košút (also Ďorď or Ďurko, 12 May 1776 – 31 July 1849) was a Hungarian nobleman, a lawyer and a supporter of the Slovak national movement.

Family
He was baptized as Georgius Kossuth on 12 May 1776 in Necpál. His parents were Pavol (Pál) and Zsuzsanna Košút (Kossuth). He had two brothers (Šimon/Simon and Ladislav/László) and one sister (Jana).

The family had lived for centuries in Kossuth, dating back to the 13th century when king Béla IV of Hungary granted them nobility and the feod in Turóc in 1263. The surname means "billy goat" in Slovak and a billy goat was also in their coat of arms. The family was a typical example of provincial gentry in the Kingdom of Hungary and was kindred with other families of the local gentry in the region of Turóc and Liptó.

The mother tongue of the Turóc branch of the family (including him and his brother László) was Slovak and the family archive also  only contains records in Slovak together with official Latin documents. His brother László moved from Kossuth to Monok and would become the father of Hungarian statesman Lajos Kossuth.

Juraj Košút studied law then he returned to the family estate. On 2 November 1803, he married Anna Zolnensis; the couple had no children.

Work

His language skills, legal education and probably also the noble origin opened him many opportunities. He was an assessor in the County Court of Turóc, a lay judge in Liptó, Trencsén and Árva counties and a superintendent of Lutheran Church in Zaturcsa. The preacher of Zaturcsa was Ján Kalinčiak, a Slovak nationalist and the father of Ján Kalinčiak – a member of Štúr's movement and a representative of Slovak romantic prose.

He became active in the Slovak national movement in 1842 when the leading personality of the movement Ľudovít Štúr required government's approval for publication of Slovak political newspaper. Štúr had to prove sufficient social interest and that the journal would have enough readers. Štúr initially attached a petition signed by priests and seminarists from the Diocese of Nyitra, but he did not succeed. In the meantime, nobles in Turóc received information about his activities. They sent him a letter in which they promised "to bear witness" about the need for Slovak political newspaper. Surprised Štúr figured out that they were led by "Košút, the uncle of that angry man from Pest [Lajos Kossuth]".

Košút organized petitions in several waves. The first two (at the end of 1842) were signed by 152 signatories who confirmed their interest in Slovak newspaper (mostly lower nobles and officials). He also noted that he collected signatures only from one part of the county and he could collect much more if necessary. The petitions had a significant impact and according to Štúr's coworker Jozef Miloslav Hurban, they directly influenced Štúr's decision to publish his newspaper in Slovak instead of Slovakized Czech (used as a written language by Slovak Protestants) and to define a new Slovak linguistic standard instead of Kollár's biblical Czech and Bernolák's standard based on West-Slovak dialect. The new standard was based on Central-Slovak dialects spoken also in Turóc.

He began corresponding with Štúr and promised him to make every effort "for the good of his (own) Slovak nation". In 1843, he organized the third petition signed by 675 signatories (according to Košút's letter to Pavol Jozefi). The details about this petition are not known, but it should be signed both by Catholic and Protestant Church authorities and the secular authorities including the vice-ispán of Turóc. He promoted a similar petition in the neighboring Liptó.

In 1844, the state authorities initiated steps to close the Department of the Czechoslovak Language and Literature in Pressburg (Prešporok, Pozsony, now Bratislava). Slovak activists reacted by fundraising campaigns to save the department. Košút organized the campaign among lower nobles in Turóc, but the department was closed. Štúr was later forced to leave Pressburg and Košút donated a part of the money collected to the Slovak students who decided to move with Štúr to Lőcse. Later, he supported Slovak society Tatrín which played an important role in the Slovak cultural life. In 1845, Štúr finally get a permission to publish a political newspaper (Slovenskje národňje novini) and Košút contributed to the newspaper as a correspondent.

Notes

References

Bibliography

External links
Košútovci
Pavol Parenička: Košút versus Kossuth
Kossuth és Petőfi, a szlovák nép két nagy gyermeke 

1776 births
1849 deaths
Hungarian people of Slovak descent
Gyorgy
Hungarian politicians
Hungarian nobility
Slovak politicians
Slovak nobility